Sweden competed at the 1960 Winter Olympics in Squaw Valley, United States.

Medalists

Biathlon

Men

 1 Two minutes added per missed target.

Cross-country skiing

Men

Men's 4 × 10 km relay

Women

Women's 3 x 5 km relay

Ice hockey

Summary

Group A 
Top two teams (shaded ones) from each group advanced to the final round and played for 1st-6th places, other teams played in the consolation round.

Canada 5–2 Sweden
Sweden 19–0 Japan

Final round 

USA 6–3 Sweden
USSR 2–2 Sweden
Czechoslovakia 3–1 Sweden
Canada 6–5 Sweden
Sweden 8–2 Germany (UTG)

Leading scorers

Nordic combined 

Events:
 normal hill ski jumping 
 15 km cross-country skiing

Ski jumping

Speed skating

Men

Women

References
 Olympic Winter Games 1960, full results by sports-reference.com

Nations at the 1960 Winter Olympics
1960 Winter Olympics